Jeremiah S. Chechik (born 1955 in Montreal, Quebec, Canada) is the director of such films as National Lampoon's Christmas Vacation, Benny & Joon, Diabolique and The Avengers.

Chechik was nominated for Worst Director at the 1998 Golden Raspberry Awards for The Avengers but lost to Gus Van Sant for his remake of Psycho.

In 2007, Chechik directed all eight episodes of The Bronx is Burning. He and producer Michael Birnbaum purchased the screen rights to House of Night, a juvenile vampire book series from authors P. C. Cast and her daughter Kristin Cast in 2008.

His film The Right Kind of Wrong was screened in the Gala Presentation section at the 2013 Toronto International Film Festival.

References

External links

1955 births
Film directors from Montreal
Canadian television directors
Living people
Place of birth missing (living people)
Anglophone Quebec people
McGill University alumni